Dham script is used to write Dhimal language. The script has been proposed for unicode encoding since 2012.

References

See also
 Dhimal language

Writing systems of Nepal